The Russian Chapel on the Vršič Pass is a Russian Orthodox chapel located on the Russian Road on the northern side of the Vršič Pass in northwestern Slovenia. The chapel, dedicated to Saint Vladimir, was built by Russian prisoners of war engaged in forced labor in the area during World War I. It serves as both a war memorial and a symbolic link between Slovenia and Russia.

History

In early 1915, the small town of Kranjska Gora suddenly became strategically important due to its proximity to the Isonzo Front. To facilitate access from the town to the front, the Austro-Hungarian authorities ordered the construction of a military road across the Vršič Pass, a  pass between the Sava and Soča Valleys, to be built by Russian prisoners of war (POWs).

The road was begun in May 1915, and was completed by the end of the year. To ensure an uninterrupted supply of materiel to the front lines, the pass was to be kept traversable year-round, and the POWs were forced to clear the road of heavy snowfall. On 8 or 12 March 1916 (sources vary), an avalanche buried a POW work camp, killing approximately 110 prisoners and about seven guards. During the time of the construction there were more than 380 casualties in total. Exact casualty figures were never determined, either for the victims of the avalanche of for those of the brutal overwork and appalling conditions.

The Russian camp was located roughly halfway up the slope of Vršic. Until November 1916, the remaining prisoners built a small wooden memorial chapel. The building is of typical Russian design, with two small towers on either side of the nave, and is surrounded by prisoners' graves and a pyramid-shaped memorial marker to the immediate right of the chapel, with the Cyrillic inscription reading "To the sons of Russia".

The site was renovated in 2005, at a cost of €90,000, and again in 2010 after a theft of the copper roof plates. The pass road on the Kranjska Gora side from the Erika Hotel to the top was renamed "Russian Road" in June 2006.

References

External links 

Vrsic
World War I memorials
Chapels in Slovenia
Monuments and memorials in Slovenia
Buildings and structures completed in 1916
Eastern Orthodox church buildings in Slovenia
Russian Orthodox chapels
1916 establishments in Slovenia
20th-century architecture in Slovenia